Ira Nelson Hollis (March 7, 1856 – August 25, 1930) was an American mechanical engineer at the US Navy, Professor of engineering at Harvard University, and president of Worcester Polytechnic Institute. He served as president of the American Society of Mechanical Engineers in the year 1917-18.

Biography

Youth, education and early naval career  
Hollis was born at Mooresville, Indiana as son of Ephriam Joseph Hollis, captain in the 59th Indiana Infantry Regiment, and Mary Kearns Hollis, a farmer's daughter. He was raised in Louisville, where he attended the local high school. After graduation he was an apprentice in a machine shop and later a clerk with a railroad and a cotton commission house.

In 1874 Hollis was admitted to the Naval Academy in Annapolis, now United States Naval Academy, at the age of eighteen at the head of the list. He graduated with honors as Cadet-Engineer in 1878 as top of his class.

After graduation Hollis served in the Navy for fifteen years at sea and on shore. The first three years he spend on the USS Quinnebaug, cruising the North Sea, Mediterranean, and coast of Africa. Subsequently he was Professor of Marine Engineer at Union College in Schenectady, New York, advisor in the Squadron of Evolution, supervisor at Union Iron Works, back at sea in charge of machinery of a vessel on the China Station, and lecturer at the Naval War College at Newport.

Later career 
After resigning from the Navy, from 1893 to 1913 Hollis was Professor engineering at the Harvard University, at the Lawrence Scientific School, nowadays Harvard John A. Paulson School of Engineering and Applied Sciences. From 1913 to 1925 he served as President of the Worcester Polytechnic Institute. 

In 1899 Harvard University had granted Hollis an honorary Master of Arts. In the same year he also obtained a Doctor of Humane Letters from Union College. He was elected  Fellow of the American Academy of Arts and Sciences, and president of the American Society of Mechanical Engineers in the year 1917-18. In 1912 he obtained a Doctor of Science from the University of Pittsburgh

Selected publications 
 Ira Nelson Hollis, The frigate Constitution; the central figure of the Navy under sail, 1900.

 Articles, a selection 
 Hollis, Ira Nelson. "A New Organization for the New Navy." Atlantic Monthly, LXXX (1897), 318-319.
 Hollis, Ira Nelson. "The Navy and the War with Spain." Atlantic Monthly 82 (1898): 605-10.
 Hollis, Ira Nelson. "The Uncertain Factors In Naval Conflicts." Atlantic Monthly, June 728 (1898).
 Hollis, Ira Nelson. "Origin of the Harvard Stadium," Harvard Engineering Journal, 1904.

References

External links 
 Ira Nelson Hollis, The Cultural Landscape Foundation

1856 births
1930 deaths
American mechanical engineers
American non-fiction writers
United States Naval Academy alumni
Union College (New York) faculty
Naval War College faculty
Harvard University faculty
Worcester Polytechnic Institute faculty
People from Mooresville, Indiana
Fellows of the American Academy of Arts and Sciences
Presidents of the American Society of Mechanical Engineers